The 2007 Buffalo Funds - NAIA Men's Division I  Basketball Tournament was held from March 14 to 20 at Municipal Auditorium in Kansas City, Missouri. This was the 70th annual NAIA basketball tournament and features 32 teams playing in a single-elimination format. This tournament had the most total points scored for both teams in one game in the history of the NAIA tournament. Totaling 243pts when Concordia (CA) got 124pts and beat Robert Morris (IL) who has 119pts. That game went into 4 overtimes. (The longest game was a 5OT game back in 1978 when Grand Canyon beat Central State (OH) 88-82.) Concordia would go on to be the 2007 runner-up to Oklahoma City University. Oklahoma City University would beat Concordia 79 to 71.

Awards and honors
Leading scorer: Eddie Smith, of Illinois–Springfield scored 33.5 points in just two games.
Leading rebounder: Zach Allender of Campbellsville in two games Zach had 31 rebounds.
Most Points, both teams, in tournament history: 243, done by Concordia (CA) (124) vs Robert Morris (IL) (119) (4OT)
Most consecutive tournament appearances: 16th, Georgetown (KY)
Most tournament appearances: Georgetown (KY), 26th of 30, appearances to the NAIA Tournament.

Bracket

See also
2007 NAIA Division I women's basketball tournament
2007 NCAA Division I men's basketball tournament
2007 NCAA Division II men's basketball tournament
2007 NCAA Division III men's basketball tournament
2007 NAIA Division II men's basketball tournament

References

NAIA Men's Basketball Championship
Tournament
NAIA Division I men's basketball tournament
NAIA Division I men's basketball tournament